Dorsey may refer to:


People
 Dorsey (surname)
 Dorsey (given name)

Places

United States
 Dorsey, Illinois, an unincorporated community
 Dorsey, Maryland, an unincorporated community
 Dorsey station, a passenger rail station
 Dorsey, Michigan
 Dorsey, Mississippi, an unincorporated community
 Dorsey, Nebraska, an unincorporated community

Elsewhere
 Dorsey, County Armagh, a village in Northern Ireland
 Dorsey Island, Antarctica

Other uses
 , a destroyer which served in both world wars
 Dorsey Road, part of Maryland Route 103
 Susan Miller Dorsey High School, high school in Baldwin Hills/Crenshaw, Los Angeles, California